The 1985 Pacific Conference Games was the fifth and final edition of the international athletics competition between five Pacific coast nations: Australia, Canada, Japan, New Zealand and the United States. Like the 1981 edition before it, athletes from beyond the Pacific grouping were allowed to compete at the tournament. A total of 21 men's and 16 women's athletics events were contested. One change was made to the event programme: the women's pentathlon was dropped in favour of the heptathlon, mirroring the same change in the Olympic programme which had happened at the 1984 Los Angeles Olympics.

The competition was held at the Edwards Stadium in Berkeley, California, with the United States being the last nation of the five original invited nations to fulfil its duty in hosting the meeting. Sports television channel ESPN broadcast highlights of the competition nationally.

Medal summary

Men

Women

References

Medalists
Pacific Conference Games. GBR Athletics. Retrieved on 2015-01-14.
Australian results in full 
Results
Day 1 partial results
Day 1 partial results

Pacific Conference Games
Pacific Conference Games
International track and field competitions hosted by the United States
Pacific Conference Games
University of California, Berkeley
20th century in Berkeley, California
Pacific Conference Games
Sports in Berkeley, California
Sports competitions in California